Alestaina is a mountain village in the municipal unit of Aroania, Achaea, Greece. In 2011, it had a population of 13. It is 2 km south of Agridi, 3 km west of Aroania (village), 2 km north of Paos and 21 km southwest of Kalavryta.

Population

See also
List of settlements in Achaea

References

External links
Alestena at the GTP Travel Pages

Populated places in Achaea